Socialist Alternative is a Trotskyist political party in the Netherlands.  It is affiliated to International Socialist Alternative.

The party was involved in the Occupy movement in the Netherlands.

History
Socialist Alternative was founded as Inter in 1977. The name was shortly after changed to Forward (Voorwaarts) and from the early 1980s to 2010 it was called Offensive (Offensief). The party has gone by its current name since September 2010, "to clearly put forward the need for a socialist alternative, in a period when the crisis of capitalism is ever more central". Since 2022, members of ISA Netherlands have been working inside new socialist formations such as Socialisten 010 in Rotterdam and Democratisch Socialisten Amsterdam, who are split offs from the SP.

Originally part of the Dutch Labour Party (PvdA), in 1998 Socialist Alternative (then still called Offensive) left the PvdA and joined the Dutch Socialist Party (SP), operating in an entryist fashion. Its members were banned from the SP in February 2009, on the grounds of being "a party within a party", since which time it has operated as an independent organisation.

References

External links
Socialist Alternative
International Socialist Alternative

1977 establishments in the Netherlands
Political parties established in 1977
Netherlands
Socialist Party (Netherlands)
Trotskyist organisations in the Netherlands